Richard C. Byrd (ca. 1805 – June 1, 1854) was an American politician who served as acting governor of Arkansas from January 10 to April 19, 1849, following the resignation of Thomas S.Drew.

Biography
Byrd was born circa 1805 in Mississippi Territory (present-day Alabama). Byrd, merchant and farmer, moved to Arkansas in 1826. He served as the second auditor of Arkansas Territory from 1829 to 1831, and in the Territorial Legislature from 1833 to 1835. Byrd served as a member of the Arkansas House of Representatives in 1836, and the Arkansas Senate in 1840, 1842, 1846, and 1848.

Byrd had an unsuccessful gubernatorial run in 1844. When Governor Thomas S. Drew resigned from office on January 10, 1849, Byrd was president of the Senate and became acting governor. He left the office on April 19, 1849, and returned to his mercantile store in Jefferson County, Arkansas. Byrd died at his home in Jefferson County following a lengthy illness.

See also
List of governors of Arkansas

References

External links
 
 Richard C. Byrd at The Political Graveyard

1805 births
Year of death unknown
19th-century American merchants
19th-century American politicians
Acting Governors of Arkansas
American merchants
American militia generals
American slave owners
Democratic Party Arkansas state senators
Burials at Flat Bayou Cemetery
Businesspeople from Arkansas
Democratic Party governors of Arkansas
Farmers from Arkansas
Government audit officials
Democratic Party members of the Arkansas House of Representatives
Members of the Arkansas Territorial Legislature
Military personnel from Arkansas
People from Alabama
Politicians from Jefferson County, Arkansas
Politicians from Little Rock, Arkansas